Miljan Pušica (born 30 June 1991) is a Serbian handball player for RK Vojvodina and the Serbia national team.

Club career
After playing for Crvena zvezda and Vojvodina, Pušica moved abroad and signed with Wisła Płock in 2014. He spent three seasons with the Polish club, before joining German team GWD Minden in 2017.

International career
A Serbia international since 2013, Pušica participated in two European Championships (2016 and 2020).

Honours
Vojvodina
 Serbian Handball Super League: 2012–13, 2013–14
 Serbian Handball Super Cup: 2013

References

External links

 EHF record

1991 births
Living people
People from Prijepolje
Serbian male handball players
RK Crvena zvezda players
RK Vojvodina players
Handball-Bundesliga players
Expatriate handball players
Serbian expatriate sportspeople in Poland
Serbian expatriate sportspeople in Germany